Dante Rossi (28 August 1936 – 15 March 2013) was an Italian water polo player who competed in the 1960 Summer Olympics and in the 1964 Summer Olympics. He was born in Bologna, Italy.

In 1960 he was a member of the Italian water polo team which won the gold medal. He played five matches as goalkeeper. Four years later he finished fourth with the Italian team in the water polo competition at the Tokyo Games. He played six matches as goalkeeper.

See also
 Italy men's Olympic water polo team records and statistics
 List of Olympic champions in men's water polo
 List of Olympic medalists in water polo (men)
 List of men's Olympic water polo tournament goalkeepers

References

External links
 
 
 
 

1936 births
2013 deaths
Italian male water polo players
Water polo goalkeepers
Water polo players at the 1960 Summer Olympics
Water polo players at the 1964 Summer Olympics
Olympic gold medalists for Italy in water polo
Medalists at the 1960 Summer Olympics
Sportspeople from Bologna